The next parliamentary elections in Moldova are to be held no later than 11 July 2025.

Electoral system 

The 101 members of Parliament are elected by party-list proportional representation in a single nationwide constituency. The electoral threshold at the national level varies according to the type of list; for parties or individual organizations it is 5%; for an electoral bloc of two parties it is 7%; for three ore more it is 11%. For independent candidates, the threshold is 2%.

Parties and coalitions

Parliamentary parties

Opinion polls

References

Moldova
Moldova
Elections in Moldova